American rock band Portugal. The Man have released eight studio albums, four extended plays (EPs) and 15 singles. The band were formed in 2004 in Wasilla, Alaska and currently consist of John Gourley, Zach Carothers, Kyle O'Quin, Jason Sechrist and Eric Howk.

"Feel It Still" became their first song to enter the Billboard Hot 100, peaking at number four. The song also broke the record for most weeks at number one on the Alternative Songs chart, with twenty weeks. On September 3, 2019, the single was certified five-times platinum by the Recording Industry Association of America (RIAA).

Studio albums

Other albums

Extended plays

Singles

As lead artist

As featured artist

Other appearances

Guest appearances

Notes

References

Rock music group discographies
Discographies of American artists